Jurjevski Dol is a dispersed settlement in the Slovene Hills in northeastern Slovenia. It belongs to the Municipality of Šentilj.

References

External links
Jurjevski Dol on Geopedia

Populated places in the Municipality of Šentilj